The Laker Girls are a National Basketball Association Cheerleading squad that supports the Los Angeles Lakers basketball team in home matches. They also perform at many other events and venues.

Jerry Buss commissioned the Laker Girls in 1979 after he had purchased the Lakers. He believed a basketball game should be entertaining, and he was a big fan of college basketball. Cheerleaders were not common in the NBA at the time, but Buss ordered the formation of the squad—a team of top female dancers who were as talented as they were sexy—as part of his vision for Showtime. "I thought the game itself was fantastic, but the ambiance was really kind of dead. It was quiet and boring, and so I thought what I'd like to do is spice it up with having some dancers," he explained.

The Laker Girls are a semi-professional squad and members hold regular day jobs ranging from professional dancers to waitresses to university professors. The squad typically performs about 30 routines over the course of the season. They are also local ambassadors for the Lakers organization, and local advocates for female empowerment in the Los Angeles area. 

The Laker Girls hold auditions in July of every year. Each current member of the squad must also audition to keep her place on the team. Each woman auditioning must come with a resume of their previous jobs. It is required that each prospective candidate comes prepared with her own routine and is taught two routines to perform for the current Laker Girls as well as some judges. Dance skills are the main criterion on which they are judged, but personality, style, and teamwork are also important.

It was as a Laker Girl that Paula Abdul was "discovered" by the group The Jacksons, in which she was hired by them to choreograph the music video for the song "Torture". This led to her doing the choreography for their Victory Tour, as well as other chances to do the choreography for other music videos. Abdul's success has given an extra prestige to being a Laker Girl.

A television movie named Laker Girls, starring Tina Yothers (from TV's Family Ties) and Alexandra Paul (Baywatch) aired in 1990, detailing the fictional tribulations of a trio of acolytes trying out to become members of the cheer leading troupe.

Notable former cheerleaders
Paula Abdul
Lisa Joann Thompson (choreographer)
Tina Landon (choreographer)
Emily Harper (actress)
Moon Bloodgood (actress)
Vanessa Curry (dancer)
Taylour Paige  (dancer)
Carmella (wrestler)
Natasha Martinez (TV host)
Shelby Rabara (actress)
Anne Fletcher (actress, director)

References

External links

Laker Girls web site (NBA.com)

Los Angeles Lakers
National Basketball Association cheerleading squads
Dance in California
History of women in California